Bangladesh competed at the 2000 Summer Olympics in Sydney, Australia.

Athletics 

Men

Women

Shooting

Women

Swimming

Men

Women

References

Nations at the 2000 Summer Olympics
2000
Olympics